La Verità is a live album by Sérgio Mendes & Brasil '77 performed live at the Greek Theatre (Los Angeles) in 1969. It was distributed by A&M Records on vinyl LP in the UK, also on audio cassette, reference number TC-MFP 30434.  To date it has not been released in the United States.

Track listing 

"Viramundo" 
"Going Out Of My Head" 
"Girl From Ipanema (Garota de Ipanema)"  
"Carnival Medley: Gioco Di Roda / Canto De Ubiratan / After Sunrise"
"Fool On The Hill"
"Chelsea Morning"
"Sometimes In Winter"
"Mas Que Nada"
"The Look Of Love"
"O Capoeira"

References

Sérgio Mendes albums
1969 live albums
Albums produced by Sérgio Mendes
A&M Records live albums